Sunny Skylar (October 11, 1913 – February 2, 2009) was an American composer, singer, lyricist, and music publisher. He was born Selig Sidney Shaftel in Brooklyn, New York, one of four children, to Sarah and Jacob Shaftel (or Schaftel), Jewish immigrants from Russia. His father sold knit goods. In the 1940s, he moved to Las Vegas, Nevada, where he was a headliner at hotels such as The Flamingo and the El Rancho, among others.

As a singer, he appeared with a number of big bands, including those led by Ben Bernie, Paul Whiteman, Abe Lyman, George Hall and Vincent Lopez. It was Lopez who changed the singer's professional name from Sonny Schuyler to Sunny Skylar. After the end of the big band era, Skylar continued to sing in nightclubs and theaters until 1952. 

He was married four times: Joyce Coleman, 1942, Manhattan, NY; Christine Belanger, 1969, Las Vegas, NV (divorced, 1971); Jari Dee Rheinick, 1974, Las Vegas, NV (divorced after one month); Jacqueline Marlene Williams Trent, 1979, Las Vegas, NV; to whom he remained married until her death in 2008).

He died in Las Vegas on February 2, 2009 and was buried in Davis Memorial Park, Las Vegas.  His grave marker shows his name as Sunny Skylar.

List of compositions
Among the songs he wrote (either music or lyrics) are:
 "Amor"
 "And So to Sleep Again" 
 "Atlanta, G.A."
 "Bésame Mucho" (translation of the original Mexican song)
 "Cry, Cry, Cry" 
 “Don’t Cry”
 "Don't Wait Too Long"
 "Gotta Be This or That"
 "Hair of Gold, Eyes of Blue"
 "I Miss Your Kiss"
 "If You Loved Me" (English version for Polnareff's 'Soul Coaxing (Ame Caline)')
 "It Must Be Jelly ('Cause Jam Don't Shake like That)"
 
 "Louisville, K.Y."
 "Love Me with All Your Heart" 
 "Nola"
 "Where There's Smoke, There's Fire"
 "You're Breaking My Heart"

References

1913 births
2009 deaths
American male composers
American music publishers (people)
Musicians from Brooklyn
American people of Russian-Jewish descent
20th-century American singers
20th-century American composers
20th-century American male singers